Shakeb Jalali or Shakeeb Jalali, born Syed Hassan Rizvi (1 October 1934 – 12 November 1966), was a Pakistani Urdu poet, considered one of the distinguished Urdu poets of the post-independence era.

Shakeb was born on 1 October 1934 in Jalal, a small village near Aligarh. His ancestors were from a small town, Saddat, near Aligarh. He committed suicide on 12 November 1966 by throwing himself before a passing train near Sargodha, Pakistan. Roushni Aye Roushni, his first poetry collection, was published posthumously in 1972. Sang-e-Meel published his complete poetical works as Kulliyat-e-Shakeb Jalali in 2004.

Further reading

See also
 List of Urdu Poets

References

External links
 

1934 births
1966 suicides
People from Aligarh
Muhajir people
Pakistani poets
Urdu-language poets from Pakistan
Pakistani Shia Muslims
20th-century poets
Suicides in Pakistan
Suicides by train